The following radio stations broadcast on AM frequency 980 kHz: 980 AM is classified as a regional broadcast frequency by the U.S. Federal Communications Commission and the Canadian Radio-television and Telecommunications Commission. Unusually, there is one Class A station on 980 AM, Canadian station CKNW in New Westminster, British Columbia.

In Argentina 
 LT39 in Victoria
 LU37 Radio 37 in General Pico, La Pampa
 Ovacion in José C Paz, Buenos Aires

In Canada

In Mexico 
 XELC-AM in La Piedad, Michoacán
XELFFS-AM in Izúcar de Matamoros, Puebla

In the United States

References

Lists of radio stations by frequency